Traian Grozăvescu (21 November 1895 – 14 February 1927) was an Austro-Hungarian-born Romanian operatic tenor. Born in Lugoj, he served in the Austro-Hungarian Army in World War I. In 1922, following a disagreement with the Cluj Opera, he left for Vienna and sang at the Vienna State Opera, as well as at the Hungarian State Opera House and the Berlin State Opera, achieving great success.

Death
He was killed with a revolver by his jealous wife and buried in his native town.

Notes

1895 births
1922 deaths
People from Lugoj
People from the Kingdom of Hungary
Romanian Austro-Hungarians
Austro-Hungarian military personnel of World War I
Romanian operatic tenors
Romanian expatriates in Austria
Romanian people murdered abroad
Deaths by firearm in Austria
20th-century Romanian male opera singers